Norman Township is an inactive township in Dent County, in the U.S. state of Missouri.

Norman Township was established in 1866, taking its name from Norman Creek.

References

Townships in Missouri
Townships in Dent County, Missouri